Minnesota State Highway 171 (MN 171) is a  short highway in the northwest corner of Minnesota, which runs from North Dakota Highway 59 at the North Dakota state line and continues east to its eastern terminus at its intersection with U.S. Highway 75 near St. Vincent. The route passes through St. Vincent.

Route description
State Highway 171 serves as a short east–west route between U.S. 75, St. Vincent, the Red River, and Pembina, ND.

The route is located in the Red River Valley region.

The route is legally defined as Route 171 in the Minnesota Statutes.

History
Highway 171 was authorized on April 22, 1933 and was originally part of State Highway 73.

By 1935, this route was renumbered as part of U.S. Highway 59.  Adjoining North Dakota Highway 59 in Pembina was numbered to match then-Highway 59 in Minnesota.

In the 1950s, this route was renumbered 171 when a realigned U.S. 59 was constructed from Lancaster north to Canada.

This route was paved (as U.S. 59) by 1940.

Since 2003, Canada-bound traffic on nearby U.S. 75 has been directed to follow State Highway 171 west into North Dakota, where it becomes North Dakota Highway 59, which intersects I-29 to Canada.  In 2006, the closure became official of the nearby Noyes border crossing on U.S. 75.  Minnesota and North Dakota have not yet petitioned AASHTO officials to change the definition of U.S. 75 to follow the routing of 171 and ND 59.  As of 2019, nearby U.S. 75 in Minnesota is still signed to what is now a dead-end at the old Noyes border crossing.

Major intersections

References

171
Transportation in Kittson County, Minnesota
U.S. Route 59
U.S. Route 75